Helge Grans (born 10 May 2002) is a Swedish professional ice hockey defenceman currently playing for the Ontario Reign in the American Hockey League (AHL) as a prospect for the Los Angeles Kings of the National Hockey League (NHL). Grans was drafted 35th overall by the Kings in the 2020 NHL Entry Draft.

Playing career
Grans was the most effective defenceman of the IF Troja-Ljungby U16 Juniors in 2016–17, scoring 12 points. In the 2017–18 season, he was the team's best scorer at U16 level, with 26 points. In the middle of the 2017–18 season, he moved to the Malmö Redhawks.

At only 16 years old Grans played his first men's league match with the Malmö Redhawks in the Champions Hockey League (CHL) on 16 October 2018 against the EHC Red Bull München. Grans scored his first Swedish Hockey League (SHL) goal on 30 December 2019 against Brynäs IF.

On 4 June 2021, Grans was signed by the Los Angeles Kings to a three-year, entry-level contract.

Career statistics

Regular season and playoffs

International

References

External links
 

2002 births
Living people
Los Angeles Kings draft picks
Malmö Redhawks players
Ontario Reign (AHL) players
People from Ljungby Municipality
Swedish ice hockey defencemen
Sportspeople from Kronoberg County